Wallqani (Aymara wallqa collar, -ni a suffix to indicate ownership, "the one with a collar", Hispanicized spelling Hualcani) is a  mountain in the Andes of southern Peru. It is located at the border of the Moquegua Region, General Sánchez Cerro Province, Ichuña District, and the Puno Region, Puno Province, Pichacani District. It lies northeast of Jukumarini Lake and the mountains Larama Quta and Jaqhi Jaqhini. The Larama Quta River originates south of the mountain. It flows to the south.

References

Mountains of Moquegua Region
Mountains of Puno Region
Mountains of Peru